Sunil Kumar, known by his stage name Narain, is an Indian actor, who has starred in Malayalam and Tamil films. He made his debut in Adoor Gopalakrishnan's Nizhalkuthu (2002), followed by performances in Malayalam films 4 the People (2004), Achuvinte Amma (2005), and Classmates (2006). Narain's Tamil debut was in Mysskin's Chithiram Pesuthadi (2006).

Acting career

Narain's first film was Nizhalkuthu. His first commercial film, 4 The People, was dubbed in Tamil and Telugu. He portrayed a struggling lawyer, Emmanuel John, in Achuvinte Amma and also played a doctor, Jeevan, in Sheelabathi. He also played roles in Annorikal and Classmates. His debut Tamil movie was Chithiram Pesuthadi. Through Panthaya Kozhi, produced by director Lal, he has been re-launched as an independent action hero in the Malayalam film industry. In 2008, he did another youth-oriented Malayalam movie Minnaminnikoottam. He has acted in more than 20 Malayalam movies.

Narain worked with director Sathyan Anthikkad in the 2005 movie Achuvinte Amma and again in 2009 in Bhagyadevatha.

Narain played the lead role in P. T. Kunju Muhammed's Veeraputhran (2011). He collaborated with director Mysskin in the 2008 film Anjaathe and in the 2012 superhero film Mugamoodi where he portrayed a villain. However his career high came through the 2019, Lokesh Kanagaraj directed venture Kaithi (2019), co starring with Karthi . In 2022, Vikram who bridges two films occurring in the same universe starring Kamal Haasan, Vijay Sethupathi, and Fahadh Faasil.

Early and personal life
Narain was born on 7 October 1979 in Kolkata. Narain completed his pre-degree from St. Thomas College, Thrissur and graduated from Sree Kerala Varma College. He did his diploma in cinematography at the MGR Government Film And Television Institute. He joined ace cinematographer Rajiv Menon and later resigned to try for chances in acting. On 26 August 2007, he married Malayalam television host Manju Haridas. Manju had hosted shows like Superstar Junior and has sung in Chithiram Pesuthadi, a Tamil film in which Narain acted. The couple has two children, a daughter born in 2008 and a son born in 2022.

Filmography

Awards and nominations
Nominations 
2007 Filmfare Awards South-
Best supporting actor -(Classmates)
  2010 Filmfare Awards South - Best Supporting Actor - (Robinhood)
 2012 - Best Actor in a Negative Role (Mugamoodi)
 2021 South Indian International Movie Awards-
Best Supporting actor -(Kaithi)

References

External links

1979 births
Living people
Male actors from Kolkata
Male actors in Tamil cinema
Male actors in Malayalam cinema
Indian male film actors
Sree Kerala Varma College alumni
21st-century Indian male actors